Sri Krishna Rai "Hridyesh" (1 September 1910 – 13 June 1999) was a literary figure of Hindi. He belongs to Kathaut, Gauspur Ghazipur U P. He was a freedom fighter. He wrote more than two dozen books and was founder of Ghazipur Nagari Pracharani Sabha.

List of works
Yuvak(1935)
Himanshu(1940)
Path Deep(1950)
Satyasatya
Maha Prakash
Ganga Mujhe Pukare
Foolo Ki Ghati(1984)
Meghdoot(1990)
Sankh Pushp(1996)
Pandit Surya Deo Sharma-Ek Jwalant Vyaktitva-(1990)
Suresh Chandra Gupta(1992)
Zamindar Ki Beti 
Band Gumnami Ka Mausam
Hridyesh Satsai
Lok Sewak

See also
 List of Indian writers

1910 births
1999 deaths
Indian writers
People from Ghazipur
Hindi-language writers
Writers from Uttar Pradesh